Christer Mårtensson (born 4 July 1954) is a Swedish curler and curling coach.

In 1982 he was inducted into the Swedish Curling Hall of Fame.

Teams

References

External links
 

Living people
1954 births
Swedish male curlers
World curling champions
European curling champions
Swedish curling champions
20th-century Swedish people